In music, Op. 19 stands for Opus number 19. Compositions that are assigned this number include:

 Barber – Symphony No. 2
 Bartók – The Miraculous Mandarin
 Beethoven – Piano Concerto No. 2
 Castelnuovo-Tedesco - Cantico
 Chausson – Poème de l'amour et de la mer
 Chopin – Boléro
 Dohnányi – Suite in F-sharp minor
 Elgar – Froissart Overture
 Fauré -  Ballade in F-sharp major
 Kabalevsky – Symphony No. 2
 Kahn - Piano Trio No. 1 
 Kosenko – Eleven Études in the Form of Old Dances
 Larsson - Pastoral Suite
 Lindblad - Symphony No. 1 in C-major
 Mendelssohn - Songs without Words, Book I
 Mosolov – Iron Foundry
 Prokofiev – Violin Concerto No. 1
 Rachmaninoff – Cello Sonata
 Ries – Violin Sonata No. 10 
 Schoenberg – Sechs kleine Klavierstücke
 Schumann – Blumenstück
 Stenhammar - Violin Sonata in A-minor
 Szymanowski – Symphony No. 2
 Weber – Symphony No. 1